Jason Colwell (born 31 January 1974 in Dublin) is an Irish former footballer.

Career
A midfielder Jason made his League of Ireland debut for UCD at Cobh Ramblers on 6 October 1991. After 160 league appearances over 6 years at UCD he joined Shamrock Rovers where he stayed for 6 years making 8 appearances in European competition. Colweel was ever present for three seasons running from the 1995–96 League of Ireland season to 1997–98 League of Ireland.

Family
His father Joe was Chairman of Shamrock Rovers in the late 1990s and also played for Drumcondra F.C. in the 1970s.

Honours
FAI Super Cup
Shamrock Rovers 1998
League of Ireland First Division
UCD 1994/95
League of Ireland First Division Shield
UCD 1994/95
Leinster Senior Cup (football): 2
UCD 1994/95, 1995/96

See also
 Association football in the Republic of Ireland

References

Living people
University College Dublin A.F.C. players
Shamrock Rovers F.C. players
League of Ireland players
League of Ireland XI players
Republic of Ireland association footballers
Association football midfielders
1974 births